Karl Trabalski (born 16 May 1923 in Leipzig, died 5 December 2009 in Düsseldorf) was a German politician and former Member of Parliament (SPD). His father was Stanislaw Trabalski, the last SPD mayor of Leipzig in 1946. He is a grandson of Franciszek Trąbalski and Richard Lipinski.

Life and career 
Karl attended the Herder-upper-secondary school in Leipzig. During the Nazi period, he was not the only student who joined the Hitler Youth. After going to school and the high school, he studied philosophy political science, business and Sociology at the University of Leipzig. However, when the communists in 1948 abducted his father, he abandoned his studies and malnourished, the eldest son of the family. A short time later, he wanted the SED – because of his socialist minions append setting, particularly because he incautiously said about the Soviet Union, a show trial. However, he left as a political refugee in 1951 in Leipzig, went to the West, and completed in Cologne his studies to become a Master of Business Administration. After graduation, he was a scholarly career in the DGB. He then worked as a business economist in the industry and the housing industry. From 1960 to 1988, the housing association board member Trabalski Düsseldorf East. In 1951 he joined the SPD in 1952 and a member of the trade union, banks and insurance companies.

Deputy
Of 24 July 1966 to 30 May 1990 was Trabalski member of the Diet of North Rhine-Westphalia. He was in each case in the constituency 045 directly elected Düsseldorf II, only in the 8th parliamentary term, he moved on the state list (list position 20) of his party in the Landtag ..

On 5 March 1969, 23 May 1979 and on 23 May 1984 he was a member of the Federal Assembly for the election of the President.

Other 
About North Rhine-Westphalia also gained Trabalski attention through his work as head of the Leipzig Housing and Construction Company. Here he came as LWF general manager in the crossfire of city government (SPD) and the CDU board. As for the financial crisis, the LWF a victim was wanted, had to roll his head. This allowed craftsmen and tenants appeased, the peace party at City Hall to be restored. Two weeks after sacking Trabalskis said Mayor Hinrich Lehmann-Grube (SPD): "We can not accuse Mr. Trabalski wrongful conduct."

Volunteering 
1958–2003 offices and activities in the welfare workers, Düsseldorf  He was a member of the AWO 45 years and over in 1992, after the death of his wife Ursula Trabalski, the chair of the local association Gerresheim. In 2003 he was appointed honorary chairman of the local clubs.  Influenced by his own experience, Karl Trabalski dedicated especially for displaced persons, refugees and immigrants. His energy was recognized among them the Order of Merit of North Rhine-Westphalia.
1966–1986 German Red Cross, Düsseldorf

External links 
 Karl Trabalski (Friedrich-Ebert-Foundation in the Archives of Social Democracy)

1923 births
2009 deaths
Politicians from Leipzig
Social Democratic Party of Germany politicians
Members of the Landtag of North Rhine-Westphalia
German people of Polish descent